Lophophelma neonoma is a moth of the family Geometridae first described by George Hampson in 1907. It is found in Sri Lanka.

This species has a wingspan of 42 mm.

References

Moths described in 1907
Pseudoterpnini